Grzegorz Halama Oklasky is Polish cabaret established in 1995 in Zielona Góra by Grzegorz Halama.

Cabaret actors include Grzegorz Halama and Jarosław Jaros. Former members of this cabaret include Marcel Chyrzyński and Marek Grabie.

Awards and distinctions 

1995

 Grand Prix - Lato Kabaretowe "Mulatka", Ełk
 I position - Przegląd Piosenki Kabaretowej OSPA
 Nagroda Specjalna Programu III Polskiego Radia
 Nagroda Radia Kielce
 I position - Festiwal PaKA w Krakowie
 II position - Festiwal Piosenki Studenckiej, Kraków
 I position - Przegląd Piosenki Studenckiej TARTAK, Warszawa

1996

 Award name Andrzej Waligórski - ANDRZEJ'96

1998

 I position on Rybnicka Jesień Kabaretowa - Ryjek

2003
 Grand Prix name professor Ludwik Sempoliński - IV Ogólnopolski Festiwal Sztuki Estradowej

2005
 Award from jury - VI Festiwal Dobrego Humoru, Gdańsk
 I position on Rybnicka Jesień Kabaretowa - Ryjek

External links 
 Official page of cabaret Grzegorz Halama Oklasky

Sources 
 Grzegorz Halama Oklasky at polskilimerick.com.pl

1995 establishments in Poland
Polish cabarets